George Theodorescu (1 October 1925 – 21 August 2007) was a Romanian equestrian. He competed in two events at the 1956 Summer Olympics. A native of Romania, Theodorescu moved to Germany at age 31 as a political refugee. His daughter Monica is a three-time Olympic team gold medalist as part of the German dressage team, and twice World Cup champion.

Bibliography

References

1925 births
2007 deaths
Romanian male equestrians
Romanian dressage riders
Olympic equestrians of Romania
Equestrians at the 1956 Summer Olympics
Dressage trainers
Romanian emigrants to Germany
Place of birth missing